Hermann Tilke (born 31 December 1954, in Olpe, Germany) is a German engineer, racing driver and circuit designer, who has designed numerous Formula One motor racing circuits.

Racing
During the 1980s, Tilke competed in touring car racing, mainly on the old Nürburgring Nordschleife circuit. He also competed in VLN endurance racing and the 24 Hours Nürburgring. He and Dirk Adorf won some VLN races with a V8Star Series in 2003 and 2004.

Civil engineering
After completing his civil engineering degree with specialization in transport and traffic management at Fachhochschule Aachen, Tilke established Tilke Engineering in 1984, combining skills in architecture, civil engineering and electronic engineering to provide complete solutions for motor racing and waste disposal projects.

Formula One
Tilke is one of four designers recognised by the FIA but has, with the exception of the Silverstone redesign in 2010, been the only one to be commissioned to design Formula One tracks. One of his first minor tasks was to design and build a short access road at the Nürburgring, earned due to contacts made by his racing efforts there. His first major job was the transformation of the fast Österreichring to the much shorter A1-Ring in Austria, in the 1990s.

Tilke was involved in the radical overhauls of European circuits, such as the Hockenheimring, Circuit de Catalunya and Nürburgring, as well as Fuji Speedway in Japan.

Tilke secured the contracts to design many high-profile new world circuits from scratch, mainly in Asia but also in eastern Europe. He designed Sepang International Circuit, Bahrain International Circuit, Shanghai International Circuit, Istanbul Park Racing Circuit, Valencia Street Circuit, Marina Bay Street Circuit, Yas Marina Circuit, Korea International Circuit and the Buddh International Circuit.  Tilke also designed the new Circuit of the Americas in Austin, Texas, where F1 made its return to the United States in 2012. Tilke's latest designs include Sochi Autodrom which hosted its first race in 2014 with the debut of Russia in F1, Kuwait Motor Town (Kuwait) which opened officially in 2019, and the Hanoi Street Circuit which was set for an inaugural race in April 2020 but got cancelled due to COVID-19.

Tilke has designed every track with several other engineers from Tilke Engineering, as well as F1's former commercial rights holder Bernie Ecclestone. After viewing the track site and "once factors such as topography, wind direction, infrastructure and soil quality are known" the design work can begin. Tilke focuses on "conceiving dramatic architecture that reflects the host country, like Sepang's lotus-leaf grandstands in Malaysia", while also aiming for spectator comfort and clear viewing. He "build[s] corners that promise a fast and interesting race but avoid pulling the field apart".

Criticism
Tilke's track designs have been the subject of criticism. A 2009 profile in The Guardian noted that Tilke "has been accused of penning boring tracks and, even worse, of butchering legendary ones like Hockenheim." Russian Formula One commentator Alexey Popov coined the term "Tilkedrome" to emphasize the characteristic ennui of tracks designed by Tilke.

Former driver and team owner Jackie Stewart was critical of Tilke in a 2011 piece in The Daily Telegraph, blaming his designs for the lack of overtaking and excitement at many Formula One races, saying they "are largely carbon copies of each other". Stewart, while praising the vast improvement the designs have brought to the sport's safety as well as "bringing fantastic amenities and luxuries to the sport", argued that the tracks have "gone too far the other way" in terms of safety. His primary complaint was that the large tarmac run-off areas fail to "penalise mistakes"; he cited the 2010 Abu Dhabi Grand Prix, where Mark Webber was unable to pass Fernando Alonso, despite the latter running wide on four occasions, because the track's run-off areas did not impede him. Stewart suggested that the run-offs be made of a substance that slowed the cars down and thus punished drivers' mistakes. Webber echoed Stewart's views, stating that he was "spot on". 1980 world champion Alan Jones described Tilke's designs as "just one constant-radius corner after another" and "boring".

Others have defended him. Driver and commentator Anthony Davidson said that Tilke "understands the demands of the modern cars...he gives us run-off areas and it's all well thought out. They are enjoyable to race on because they suit modern F1 cars. At a track like Silverstone you do not get as much overtaking because it was designed for cars that were slower and did not depend on downforce for speed. But the circuits designed in recent years have a long straight and bigger braking zone." He particularly praised Turn Eight of Istanbul Park.

List of circuits
Tilke has secured contracts to design many new circuits.

References

External links
 https://web.archive.org/web/20070927185142/http://emagazine.credit-suisse.com/app/article/index.cfm?fuseaction=OpenArticle&aoid=46257&coid=88&lang=EN
 http://www.grandprix.com/ns/ns19865.html
 Work on the street circuit in Valencia
 Tilke Engineering
 Kazakhstan Motor City 

1954 births
Living people
People from Olpe, Germany
Sportspeople from Arnsberg (region)
Formula One people
Motorsport venue designers
20th-century German architects
German motorsport people
Racing drivers from North Rhine-Westphalia
Nürburgring 24 Hours drivers